Rodney Christian McGruder (born July 29, 1991) is an American professional basketball player for the Detroit Pistons of the National Basketball Association (NBA). He played college basketball for the Kansas State Wildcats.

College career
McGruder, a 6'4" shooting guard from Landover, Maryland, was an AAU teammate of Michael Beasley's and followed Beasley's path to Kansas State to play for coach Frank Martin.  McGruder started for three seasons for the Wildcats.  As a sophomore in 2010–11, McGruder teamed with backcourt mate Jacob Pullen to lead the Wildcats to a third place Big 12 Conference finish.  McGruder averaged 11.1 points and a team-best 5.9 rebounds per game.

In his junior season, McGruder upped his scoring to 15.8 per game and made the second team All-Big 12.

As a senior in 2012–13, McGruder was a preseason All-Big 12 pick.  He was also named a top 30 finalist for the Naismith College Player of the Year on February 27, 2013. During his senior season, McGruder led the Wildcats to a first-place finish in the Big XII.

Professional career

Atomerőmű (2013–2014) 

After going undrafted in the 2013 NBA draft, McGruder joined the Orlando Magic for the Orlando Summer League and the Charlotte Bobcats for the Las Vegas Summer League. On September 27, 2013, he signed with the Oklahoma City Thunder. However, he was later waived by the Thunder on October 25, 2013.

In November 2013, McGruder signed with Atomerőmű SE of Hungary for the 2013–14 season. In 29 league games for Atomerőmű, he averaged 14.4 points, 5.3 rebounds and 2.3 assists per game.

Maine Red Claws (2014–2015) 
In July 2014, McGruder joined the Golden State Warriors for the 2014 NBA Summer League. On September 29, 2014, he signed with the Boston Celtics. However, he was later waived by the Celtics on October 27, 2014. Four days later, he was acquired by the Maine Red Claws as an affiliate player. On March 26, 2015, he was waived by the Red Claws after appearing in 26 games.

Sioux Falls Skyforce (2015–2016) 
On March 29, 2015, McGruder was acquired by the Sioux Falls Skyforce.

In July 2015, McGruder joined the Miami Heat for the 2015 NBA Summer League. On November 2, 2015, he was reacquired by the Skyforce. He helped the Skyforce finish with a D-League-best 40–10 record in 2015–16, and went on to help the team win the league championship with a 2–1 Finals series win over the Los Angeles D-Fenders.

Miami Heat (2016–2019)

In July 2016, McGruder re-joined the Miami Heat for the 2016 NBA Summer League. On July 7, he signed a three-year, partially guaranteed contract with the Heat. He made his NBA debut in the Heat's season opener on October 26, 2016 against the Orlando Magic. In just under 24 minutes off the bench, he recorded six points, three rebounds and two steals in a 108–96 win. On February 6, 2017, he scored a season-high 15 points against the Minnesota Timberwolves.

On October 12, 2017, McGruder was ruled out indefinitely with a stress fracture in his left leg. He made his season debut for the Heat on February 27, 2018 against the Philadelphia 76ers after playing two games for the Sioux Falls Skyforce just days prior.

On April 7, 2019, McGruder was waived by the Heat.

Los Angeles Clippers (2019–2020)
On April 9, 2019, McGruder was claimed off waivers by the Los Angeles Clippers.

Detroit Pistons (2020–present)
On November 19, 2020, McGruder was traded to the Detroit Pistons in a three-team trade that sent Justin Patton and Luke Kennard to the Clippers. On August 6, 2021, McGruder was waived by the Pistons. On August 11, 2021, McGruder was re-signed by the Pistons.

On January 10, 2022, McGruder was traded along with a 2022 second-round draft pick via the Brooklyn Nets to the Denver Nuggets in exchange for Bol Bol.  However, the trade was voided on January 13, 2022, after Bol failed his physical, leading to McGruder returning to the Pistons.

He was re-signed by the Detroit Pistons on August 1, 2022.

Career statistics

NBA

Regular season

|-
| style="text-align:left;"| 
| style="text-align:left;"| Miami
| 78 || 65 || 25.2 || .413 || .332 || .620 || 3.3 || 1.6 || .6 || .2 || 6.4
|-
| style="text-align:left;"| 
| style="text-align:left;"| Miami
| 18 || 2 || 16.6 || .493 || .429 || .500 || 1.8 || .9 || .4 || .2 || 5.1
|-
| style="text-align:left;"| 
| style="text-align:left;"| Miami
| 66 || 45 || 23.5 || .403 || .351 || .722 || 3.6 || 1.7 || .5 || .2 || 7.6
|-
| style="text-align:left;"| 
| style="text-align:left;"| L.A. Clippers
| 56 || 4 || 15.6 || .398 || .270 || .559 || 2.7 || .6 || .5 || .1 || 3.3
|-
| style="text-align:left;"| 
| style="text-align:left;"| Detroit
| 16 || 2 || 12.1 || .529 || .458 || .750 || 1.4 || 1.0 || .5 || .1 || 5.7
|-
| style="text-align:left;"| 
| style="text-align:left;"| Detroit
| 51 || 2 || 14.8 || .436 || .397 || .731 || 2.2 || .9 || .4 || .1 || 5.4
|- class="sortbottom"
| style="text-align:center;" colspan="2"| Career
| 285 || 120 || 19.8 || .421 || .352 || .658 || 2.8 || 1.2 || .5 || .2 || 5.8

Playoffs

|-
| style="text-align:left;"| 2018
| style="text-align:left;"| Miami
| 4 || 0 || 4.0 || .250 || .000 || – || 1.0 || .0 || .0 || .0 || .5
|-
| style="text-align:left;"| 2020
| style="text-align:left;"| L.A. Clippers
| 5 || 0 || 3.2 || .600 || .667 || – || .8 || .4 || .0 || .0 || 1.6
|- class="sortbottom"
| style="text-align:center;" colspan="2"| Career
| 9 || 0 || 3.6 || .444 || .400 || – || .9 || .2 || .0 || .0 || 1.1

College

|-
| style="text-align:left;"| 2009–10
| style="text-align:left;"| Kansas State
| 33 || 0 || 12.3 || .495 || .419 || .720 || 2.8 || .5 || .3 || .3 || 3.9
|-
| style="text-align:left;"| 2010–11
| style="text-align:left;"| Kansas State
| 34 || 33 || 30.6 || .439 || .408 || .710 || 5.9 || 1.5 || .7 || .2 || 11.1
|-
| style="text-align:left;"| 2011–12
| style="text-align:left;"| Kansas State
| 33 || 33 || 32.9 || .463 || .385 || .802 || 5.2 || 1.4 || 1.2 || .3 || 15.8
|-
| style="text-align:left;"| 2012–13
| style="text-align:left;"| Kansas State
| 35 || 34 || 33.5 || .442 || .336 || .752 || 5.4 || 2.0 || 1.3 || .3 || 15.6
|- class="sortbottom"
| style="text-align:center;" colspan="2"| Career
| 135 || 100 || 27.4 || .452 || .381 || .759 || 4.8 || 1.4 || .9 || .3 || 11.7

References

External links 

Kansas State Wildcats bio

1991 births
Living people
American expatriate basketball people in Hungary
American men's basketball players
Archbishop Carroll High School (Washington, D.C.) alumni
Atomerőmű SE players
Basketball players from Maryland
Detroit Pistons players
Kansas State Wildcats men's basketball players
Los Angeles Clippers players
Maine Red Claws players
Miami Heat players
People from Landover, Maryland
People from Seabrook, Maryland
Shooting guards
Sioux Falls Skyforce players
Sportspeople from the Washington metropolitan area
Undrafted National Basketball Association players